Labrisomus philippii, the Chalaco clinid, is a species of labrisomid blenny native to the Pacific coast of South America from Peru to Chile. The identity of the person honoured by Steindachner in the specific name of this fish is unknown but it is thought to be one of the Chilean family of naturalists, the Philippis, Rodolfo Amando Philippi (1808-1904), the German-Chilean paleontologist and zoologist, his brother Bernhard Eunom Philippi (1811-1852) or Rudolfo's son, Federico Philippi (1838-1910).

References

philippii
Taxa named by Franz Steindachner
Fish described in 1866